Zuma, the seventh studio album by Canadian/American musician Neil Young, was released on Reprise Records in November 1975. Co-credited to Crazy Horse, it includes "Cortez the Killer," one of Young's best-known songs. 

Upon release, it peaked at #25 on the Billboard 200. In 1997, the album received a RIAA gold certification. In 2000, it was voted number 410 in Colin Larkin's All Time Top 1000 Albums.

Background
The death of former Crazy Horse guitarist and bandmate Danny Whitten from an alcohol/diazepam overdose in 1972 affected Neil Young greatly and contributed to a hiatus of Crazy Horse. 

Late in 1973, Young went on tour with the Crazy Horse rhythm section of bassist Billy Talbot and drummer Ralph Molina; the multi-instrumentalist Nils Lofgren, who had played on Young's After the Gold Rush (1970) before joining the Whitten-led iteration of Crazy Horse from 1970 to 1971; and the Stray Gators holdover Ben Keith. This group,  initially billed as Crazy Horse at its first engagements, became known as the Santa Monica Flyers. They recorded most of the tracks on Tonight's the Night (1975). 

After the 1974 stadium tour with Crosby, Stills & Nash and another abandoned attempt at a second CSNY studio album, Young formed a new version of Crazy Horse in 1975 with rhythm guitarist Frank Sampedro alongside of Talbot and Molina. Aside from a brief period in the late 1980s, this line-up would remain stable until 2014, after which Sampedro retired and was eventually replaced in 2018 by Lofgren.

Content
Zuma was the first album released after the so-called Ditch Trilogy, of the albums Time Fades Away, On the Beach, and Tonight's the Night.

The melody and lyrics of "Don't Cry No Tears" are partially derived from "I Wonder", a song Young wrote in high school which appeared in his Archives (2009). During a show in 1996, Young claimed  that he'd also written "Cortez the Killer" in high school while suffering from "Montezuma's Revenge". The song ends with a fade out because a power surge caused the original cut to stop abruptly, and an additional final verse was not recorded. Young's reaction to hearing of this was that he "never liked that verse anyway" and it has never been performed live.

In "Danger Bird" Young interpolates sections of an unreleased song called "L.A. Girls and Ocean Boys" that had related to Young's breakup with Carrie Snodgress, specifically the line "'Cause you've been with another man / there you are and here I am."

Record World said of "Drive Back" that "Electric guitars wail with total abandon,
yet Neil keps the lid on things with one of his gripping vocal performances."

Record World said that the single "Lookin' for a Love" "is perhaps Young's most accessible performance since 'Heart of Gold.'"

Track listing
All tracks are written by Neil Young.

Personnel
 Neil Young – vocals, guitars, piano

Crazy Horse
 Frank Sampedro – rhythm guitar 
 Billy Talbot – bass , backing vocals 
 Ralph Molina – drums , backing vocals 

Additional musicians
 Tim Drummond – bass 
 Stephen Stills – bass, backing vocals 
 David Crosby, Graham Nash – backing vocals 
 Russ Kunkel – congas 
Technical
Mazzeo - cover artwork

Charts

Certifications

References

External links
 "Neil Young With Crazy Horse – Zuma". Discogs.

 Zuma at Myspace (streamed copy where licensed)

Neil Young albums
Crazy Horse (band) albums
1975 albums
Albums produced by David Briggs (producer)
Albums produced by Neil Young
Reprise Records albums
Roots rock albums